Natronorubrum is a genus in the family Halobacteriaceae.

References

Further reading

Scientific journals

Scientific books

External links

Archaea genera
Halobacteria